Physetica funerea is a species of moth of the family Noctuidae. It is endemic to New Zealand and is found only in the western and central parts of the South Island. This species inhabits shrubland in the subalpine and alpine zones. The life history of this species is unknown as are the larval host species. Adults of this species are on the wing from October to February. This species is almost identical to P. cucullina with the only difference between the two species being the structure of the male antennae. P. funerea is also similar in appearance to P. sequens, but the latter species tends to have a prominently underlined kidney-shaped mark nearer to the outer edge of the forewing.

Taxonomy 
This species was first described by Alfred Philpott in 1927 and named Aletia funerea. In 1928 George Hudson synonymised this name with the species now known as Physetica cucullina. In 2017 Robert Hoare undertook a review of New Zealand Noctuinae and reinstated this species in the genus Physetica. The female holotype specimen was collected at  Mount Arthur tableland by Philpott and is held at the New Zealand Arthropod Collection.

Description 
Philpott originally described this species as follows:

The wingspan of the adult male is between 32 and 41 mm whereas the female is between 38 and 40 mm. This species is almost identical to P. cucullina with the only difference between the two species being the male antenna. The male antennae of P. funerea have indistinct appressed ciliations where as P. cucullina have distinct erect ciliation. P. funerea can appear similar to specimens of P. sequens, but the later species tends to have a prominently underlined kidney-shaped mark nearer to the outer edge of the forewing, in contrast to P. sequens.

Distribution 

P. funerea is endemic to New Zealand and is found only in the western and central parts of the South Island.

Habitat 
This species inhabits shrubland in the subalpine and alpine zones.

Behaviour 
Adults of this species are on the wing from October to February.

Life history and host plants 
The life history of this species is unknown as are the larval host species.

References

Hadeninae
Moths of New Zealand
Endemic fauna of New Zealand
Moths described in 1927
Taxa named by Alfred Philpott
Endemic moths of New Zealand